Dongchon Station is a station of the Daegu Subway Line 1 in Geomsa-dong, Dong District, Daegu, South Korea. It is located at Dongchon old course (동촌구길). As it is connected with Ayanggyo station by underwater tunnel, it is deeper than any other station of Daegu Subway Line 1.

References

External links 

 DTRO virtual station

Dong District, Daegu
Daegu Metro stations
Railway stations opened in 1998